Ham Neshin (also Romanized as Ham Neshīn and Hamneshīn) is a village in Minjavan-e Sharqi Rural District, Minjavan District, Khoda Afarin County, East Azerbaijan Province, Iran. At the 2006 census, its population was 131, in 30 families.

In the wake of White Revolution (early 1960s) a clan of Mohammad Khanlu tribe, comprising 25 households,  used Ham Neshin as their winter quarters.

References 

Populated places in Khoda Afarin County
Kurdish settlements in East Azerbaijan Province